Pong is a 1972 video game created by video game pioneer Al Alcorn.

Pong may also refer to:

Pong District, a district in Phayao Province, Thailand
Kingdom of Pong, an ancient Shan kingdom
Ban Pong (commune) or Pong, a commune in Cambodia, or a village in the commune
Pong, a response to a ping in a ping-pong scheme
, a set of three identical tiles in mahjong

People with the surname
James Pong (1911–1988), Hong Kong Episcopalian bishop
Pong Son-hwa (born 1993), North Korean footballer

See also

Beer pong, a drinking game
Ping pong or table tennis
Pong 1 language
Pong language 2

Poong (disambiguation)